The Fieseler Fi 253 Spatz, (English: Sparrow), was a light civilian aircraft, manufactured by the German company Fieseler in Nazi Germany. Only six units were produced, however, due to the Second World War.

Development
In January 1937 Major Werner Junck, chief of the LC II, the technical wing of the Reichsluftfahrtministerium responsible for the development of new aircraft, informed various minor aircraft manufacturers such as Bücker, Fieseler, Gothaer Waggonfabrik, Flugzeugwerke Halle and Klemm that they would not get any contracts for the development of military aircraft. He therefore advised them to concentrate in the development of a Volksflugzeug or a small twin-engined plane. As a result, Fieseler developed the Fi 253, while the other companies produced the Kl 105, the Si 202, the Bü 180 and the Go 150.

Specifications

References

1930s German civil utility aircraft
High-wing aircraft
Single-engined tractor aircraft
Fi 253
Aircraft first flown in 1937